Acrocercops sauropis is a moth of the family Gracillariidae. It is known from India (Meghalaya).

References

sauropis
Moths described in 1908
Moths of Asia